Jeb Bishop (born 1962) is an American jazz trombone player.

He grew up in Raleigh, North Carolina, and attended Jesse O. Sanderson High School.  He has studied music (classical trombone performance) at Northwestern University, engineering and philosophy at North Carolina State University, and philosophy at the University of North Carolina at Chapel Hill, the University of Arizona, Loyola University, and the Catholic University of Louvain, Belgium.

In the 1980s, he played electric bass and electric guitar in rock bands including Stillborn Christians, Egg, and/or, and the Angels of Epistemology (a band based in Raleigh and Chapel Hill that released a CD on Merge Records).

In the 1990s, he moved to Chicago and began transitioning from rock to jazz music. He played bass guitar in The Flying Luttenbachers (a jazz/rock band) and a jazz group led by Ken Vandermark called the Unheard Music Quartet. By the mid 1990s he was performing in public on the trombone while also playing electric guitar (and trombone) in the Vandermark Five. He has also been a member of several of Vandermark's other groups including School Days.

By 2000 or so he was focusing exclusively on trombone and formed his own trio, the Jeb Bishop Trio, with Vandermark Five cohorts bassist Kent Kessler and drummer Tim Mulvenna. The trio has two CDs on OkkaDisk, the second with guest guitarist Jeff Parker.

Bishop has also performed and recorded with a great many other local, national, and international musicians. He is a member of the Peter Brötzmann Chicago Tentet and has recorded duo albums with Joe McPhee and Sebi Tramontana. He has recorded and toured with English improvisers Tony Bevan and John Edwards. Regular Chicago collaborators include Fred Lonberg-Holm, Michael Zerang, Josh Abrams, and Hamid Drake.

In 2005, Bishop left the Vandermark Five and his live performances became infrequent. He cited problems with tinnitus; it was feared he had retired from music altogether. However, he became more musically active again the following year.

Discography

As leader/co-leader
 Jeb Bishop: 98 Duets (Wobbly Rail, 1998)
 Jeb Bishop Trio: Jeb Bishop Trio (Okka Disk, 1999)
 Jeb Bishop Trio/Quartet: Afternoons (Okka Disk, 2001)
 Jeb Bishop & Sebi Tramontana: Chicago Defenders (Wobbly Rail, 2002)
 Lucky 7s: Farragut (Lakefront Digital, 2006)
 Lucky 7s: Pluto Junkyard (Clean Feed Records, 2009)
 Jeb Bishop Trio: 2009 (Better Animal Recordings, 2009)
 Jeb Bishop & Jorrit Dijkstra: 1000 Words (Driff Records, 2012)
 Jeb Bishop & Tim Daisy: Old Shoulders (Relay Recordings, 2012)

With Joe McPhee
The Brass City (Okka Disk, 1997)
With The Engines
The Engines (Okka Disk, 2007)
Other Violets (Not Two, 2013)

References

External links
official site
1999 profile in the Chicago Reader
interview at All About Jazz

1962 births
Living people
Bienen School of Music alumni
University of North Carolina at Chapel Hill alumni
North Carolina State University alumni
University of Arizona alumni
Musicians from Chicago
American jazz trombonists
Male trombonists
Musicians from Raleigh, North Carolina
Free improvisation
Avant-garde jazz musicians
Avant-garde jazz trombonists
Free improvising musicians
The Flying Luttenbachers members
Jazz musicians from Illinois
Jazz musicians from North Carolina
21st-century trombonists
21st-century American male musicians
American male jazz musicians
Globe Unity Orchestra members
RogueArt artists
Okka Disk artists